Nonkululeko Merina Cheryl Nyembezi, also Nku (born 22 March 1960), is a South African engineer, businesswoman and corporate executive who was appointed Chairperson-designate at Standard Bank Group and Standard Bank of South Africa, on 10 May 2022. She will assume office on 1 June 2022, replacing Thulani Geabashe, who retires on 31 May 2022. She has been active in steel, telecommunications and finance. Since March 2014, she has been CEO of the Dutch mining group, IchorCoal N.V.

Biography
Nyembezi was born in Pietermaritzburg, South Africa, to father Aubrey , an attorney and mother Debiya Nyembezi, a nurse from Pietermaritzburg. She has an older brother (Manqoba Nyembezi) and a younger sister (Nontando Nyembezi). Brought up in a Methodist family, she attended a Bantu primary school in Clermont, KwaZulu-Natal, before embarking on her secondary school education at Inanda Seminary School near Durban. She obtained exceptionally good results in science and maths, becoming the top student in South Africa in her Junior Certificate year. After receiving her Senior Certificate, she was awarded an Awarded Anglo American Corporation Open Scholarship. She went on to graduate in electrical engineering at the University of Manchester Institute of Science and Technology and earned a Master of Science degree from the California Institute of Technology. She also has an MBA from the Open University Business School.

After first working in various positions with IBM in the United States and South Africa (1986–98), she moved to Alliance Capital Management where she headed financial services. In 2008, she was appointed executive director of ArcelorMittal South Africa where she remained for six years. In March 2014, she joined IchorCoal as CEO. Nyembezi-Heita has also served on the boards of several other companies.

In 2012, Nyembezi was listed 97th in Forbes list of The World's 100 Most Powerful Women.

References

1960 births
Living people
People from Pietermaritzburg
South African chief executives
South African engineers
21st-century South African businesswomen
21st-century South African businesspeople
20th-century South African businesswomen
20th-century South African businesspeople
Alumni of the University of Manchester
California Institute of Technology alumni
Alumni of the Open University
South African women business executives